This is the list of People's Deputies of the Verkhovna Rada first convocation which initially was called People's Deputies of the Verkhovna Rada of Ukrainian SSR twelfth convocation. The first convocation was accepted on May 15, 1990, and dismissed on May 10, 1994. Eleven deputies have surrendered their mandate without replacement. Other 25 were replaced during the time of the first convocation.

Autonomous Republic of Crimea

Cherkasy Oblast

Chernihiv Oblast

Chernivtsi Oblast

Dnipropetrovsk Oblast

Donetsk Oblast

Ivano-Frankivsk Oblast

Kharkiv Oblast

Kherson Oblast

Khmelnytskyi Oblast

Kyiv Oblast

Kirovohrad Oblast

Luhansk Oblast

Lviv Oblast

Mykolaiv Oblast

Odesa Oblast

Poltava Oblast

Rivne Oblast

Sumy Oblast

Ternopil Oblast

Vinnytsia Oblast

Volyn Oblast

Zakarpattia Oblast

Zaporizhzhia Oblast

Zhytomyr Oblast

Kyiv

Sevastopol

Sources
 Verkhovna Rada

See also
1990 Ukrainian parliamentary election

1990-1994
Parliament

1st Ukrainian Verkhovna Rada